Animals or Human is a second album by Eurodance group Captain Hollywood Project released on March 30, 1995, by Blow Up. The record includes the singles Flying High, Find Another Way, and The Way Love Is.

Track listing
  Flying High (Single mix) 3:45
  The Way Love Is 5:39
  One Love 5:55
  I Need A Lover 5:48
  Animals Or Human 5:22
  Find Another Way (Single mix) 3:56
  Odyssey Of Emotions 6:06
  Relax Your Mind 6:02
  Sea Of Dreams 5:37
  Lost In Gravity 6:20
  Get Hypnotized 5:52

Charts

Credits
Artwork [Direction] – Eike König 
Artwork, Design – Eike König, Silver Haze 
Photography By – Esser & Strauß GmbH

Notes
℗1995 DMP GmbH 
©1995 Intercord Ton GmbH

References

Captain Hollywood Project albums
1995 debut albums